Tundla Kham is a census town in Firozabad district in the Indian state of Uttar Pradesh.

Demographics
 India census, Tundla Kham had a population of 5,156. Males constitute 53% of the population and females 47%. Tundla Kham has an average literacy rate of 74%, higher than the national average of 59.5%: male literacy is 82%, and female literacy is 65%. In Tundla Kham, 15% of the population is under 6 years of age.

References

Cities and towns in Firozabad district